List of notable events in music that took place in the year 1965.


Specific locations
1965 in British music
1965 in Norwegian music

Specific genres
1965 in country music
1965 in jazz

Events
January 4 – Fender Musical Instruments Corporation is sold to CBS for $13 million.
January 12 – Hullabaloo premieres on NBC. The first show includes performances by The New Christy Minstrels, comedian Woody Allen, actress Joey Heatherton and a segment from London in which Brian Epstein introduces The Zombies and Gerry & the Pacemakers.
January 17 – The Rolling Stones drummer Charlie Watts' book Ode to a High Flying Bird, a tribute to jazz great Charlie Parker, is published.
January 21
The Animals' show at New York's Apollo Theater is canceled after the U.S. Immigration Department forces the group to leave the theater.
The Rolling Stones and Roy Orbison travel to Sydney to begin their Australian tour.
January 23 – "Downtown" hits #1 in the US singles chart, making Petula Clark the first British female vocalist to reach the coveted position since the arrival of The Beatles.
January 24 – The Animals appear a second time on The Ed Sullivan Show.
January 27 – Paul Simon broadcasts on BBC's Five to Ten show, discussing and playing 13 songs, 12 of which would appear on his May-recorded and August-released UK-only solo album, The Paul Simon Song Book.
February 6 – Donovan performs the first of three performances on the British television program Ready, Steady, Go! This presents him to a widespread audience for the first time.
February 12 – NME reports The Beatles will star in a film adaptation of Richard Condon's novel A Talent for Loving. The story is about a  horse race that takes place in the old west. The film is never made.
February 19 - Rod Stewart with The Soul Agents perform their first important concert in London club London Borough of Harrow
February 24 – The Beatles begin filming their second film, Help!
March 6 – The Temptations' "My Girl", written by Smokey Robinson and Ronald White, from Motown Records, reaches number 1.
March 18 – The Rolling Stones members Mick Jagger, Brian Jones and Bill Wyman are fined five pounds for urinating on the wall of a London petrol station. The band had asked to use the restroom, but it was out of order.
March 20 – The 10th Eurovision Song Contest in Naples, Italy, is won by 17-year-old France Gall, representing Luxembourg, with the Serge Gainsbourg-composed "Poupée de cire, poupée de son".
March 21 – The Supremes have their fourth number-one single, "Stop! In The Name Of Love", written by H-D-H.
April 11 – The New Musical Express poll winners' concert takes place featuring performances by The Beatles, The Animals, The Rolling Stones, Freddie and the Dreamers, the Kinks, the Searchers, Herman's Hermits, The Anita Kerr Singers, The Moody Blues, Wayne Fontana and the Mindbenders, Donovan, Them, Cilla Black, Dusty Springfield and Tom Jones.
April 13 – The 7th Annual Grammy Awards are held in Beverly Hills. João Gilberto and Stan Getz each win the most awards with four, the latter winning Record of the Year with Astrud Gilberto for the song "The Girl from Ipanema" and the pair collectively winning Album of the Year for Getz/Gilberto. Louis Armstrong's "Hello, Dolly!" wins Song of the Year, while The Beatles win Best New Artist.
April 21 – The Beach Boys appear on Shindig! performing their most recent hit, "Do You Wanna Dance?"
April 26 – Leopold Stokowski conducts the first complete performance of Charles Ives' Symphony No. 4, more than ten years after the composer's death.
May 5 – Alan Price leaves The Animals, to be replaced temporarily by Mick Gallagher and permanently by Dave Rowberry.
May 6
 Keith Richards and Mick Jagger begin work on "Satisfaction" in their Clearwater, Florida, hotel room. Richards comes up with the classic guitar riff while playing around with his brand new Gibson "Fuzz box".
 The Symphony of the New World, the first racially integrated orchestra in the United States, plays its first concert, under its founding conductor Benjamin Steinberg in Carnegie Hall, New York City.
May 8 – The British Commonwealth comes closer than it ever has, or will, to a clean sweep of the US Hot 100's top 10, lacking only a hit at number 2 instead of "Count Me In" by the American group Gary Lewis & The Playboys.
May 9 – Bob Dylan performs the first of two concerts at London's Royal Albert Hall, concluding his tour of Europe. Audience members include The Beatles and Donovan.
May 30 – The Animals appear a third time on The Ed Sullivan Show.
June
Producer Tom Wilson, (Simon & Garfunkel) records a heavy backing band onto the song "The Sound of Silence", without the knowledge of Paul Simon, for release on a 45 rpm single, and the B-side, "We've Got A Groovey Thing Goin'". The single will eventually reach number 1 on the Billboard Hot 100 on New Year's Day 1966.
The US music press popularize the term "folk rock", which has been in print at least since the November 2, 1963, issue of Billboard magazine, in which "Devil's Waitin'" by the Glencoves was said to have a "wide open folk-rock sound." The term was also used of "Twins" by Kingtones (March 7, 1964), the Men (July 25, 1964), and even of Hoyt Axton. People outside the trade begin to take notice of the term in June, 1965.
June 6 – The Supremes have their fifth consecutive number-one single, "Back in My Arms Again, written by H-D-H, from Motown Records.
June 14 – Paul McCartney records "Yesterday".
July 5 – Maria Callas gives her last operatic performance, as Tosca at the Royal Opera House, Covent Garden.
July 9 – The release of the Tamil musical film Aayirathil Oruvan marks the end of the composing partnership between T. K. Ramamoorthy and M. S. Viswanathan.
July 25 – Electric Dylan controversy: Bob Dylan, playing a second day at the Newport Folk Festival, is booed for playing an electric set with The Paul Butterfield Blues Band. Joan Baez and Donovan also play sets.
August 6
The Small Faces release "Whatcha Gonna Do About It", their first single.
The Beatles release the soundtrack to their second movie Help!
August 14 – The husband-and-wife American pop duo Sonny & Cher earn their first number one hit I Got You Babe. It peaks at that position in the United States, United Kingdom, Canada and New Zealand.
August 15 – The Beatles play at Shea Stadium, the first rock concert to be held in a venue of this size. The concert also sets new world records for attendance (55,600+) and for revenue.
August 27 – The Beatles visit Elvis Presley at his home in Bel-Air. It is the only time the band and the singer meet.
September 30 – Donovan appears on Shindig! in the U.S. and plays Buffy Sainte-Marie's "Universal Soldier".
October 15 – Guitarist Jimi Hendrix signs a three-year recording contract with Ed Chaplin, receiving $1 and 1% royalty on records with Curtis Knight. The agreement will later cause continuous litigation problems with Hendrix and other record labels.
October 17 – The Animals appear a fourth time on The Ed Sullivan Show.
October 26 – The Beatles are appointed Members of the British Empire (MBE) by the Queen. Since it is unusual at this time for popular musicians to be appointed as MBEs, a number of previous recipients complain and protest.
November 5 – The Who release their iconic single "My Generation" in the UK. This song contains the famous line: "I hope I die before I get old"
November 14 – The Supremes have their sixth number-one record, "I Hear A Symphony", for Motown Records.
November 26 – Arlo Guthrie is arrested in Great Barrington, Massachusetts, for the crime of littering, perpetrated the day before (Thanksgiving) in the nearby town of Stockbridge. The resultant events and adventure will be immortalized in the song "Alice's Restaurant".
December 3
The Beatles release their album Rubber Soul, along with the double A-sided single "Day Tripper / We Can Work It Out".  George Harrison's performance on the sitar on the track "Norwegian Wood" leads to his becoming a pupil of Ravi Shankar.
The Who release their debut album My Generation.
Undated
Rockfield Studios (near Rockfield, Monmouthshire in Wales) becomes the world's first residential recording studio.
Toho College of Music is established in Kawagoe, Saitama, Japan.
Michael Tippett is invited as guest composer to the music festival in Aspen, Colorado. The visit leads to major changes in his style.

New bands
See :Category:Musical groups established in 1965

Bands disbanded
Paul & Paula

Albums released

January

February

March

April

May

June

July

August

September

October

November

December

Release date unknown

12 éxitos para 2 guitarras flamencas – Paco de Lucía & Ricardo Modrego
Andy Williams' Dear Heart – Andy Williams
A World of Our Own – The Seekers
The Best of Al Hirt – Al Hirt
Blue Kentucky Girl – Loretta Lynn
Blues for Easy Livers – Jimmy Witherspoon
Buscando Un Amor – Los Freddy's
By Myself – Julie London
Canzoni napoletane classiche – Mario Trevi
Catch Us if You Can – The Dave Clark Five
Celebrations For a Grey Day – Richard Farina and Mimi Farina
Cliff Richard – Cliff Richard
Complete Communion – Don Cherry
Concert in the Virgin Islands – Duke Ellington
Country Songs for City Folks – Jerry Lee Lewis
Country Willie – His Own Songs – Willie Nelson
Country Willie: His Own Songs – Willie Nelson
Creation – John Coltrane
Do I Hear a Waltz? – Sergio Franchi, Elizabeth Allen, Original cast
Downtown – Petula Clark
Drive-In Movie Time – Bobby Vinton
Duke Ellington Plays Mary Poppins – Duke Ellington
Ella at Duke's Place – Ella Fitzgerald and Duke Ellington
Ella in Hamburg – Ella Fitzgerald
Em Som Maior – Sambrasa Trio
Feeling Good – Julie London
Fiddler on the Roof – Original soundtrack
Fire Music – Archie Shepp
The Fugs First Album – The Fugs
The Gigolo – Lee Morgan
Hang on Sloopy – The McCoys
The Heliocentric Worlds of Sun Ra, Volume One – Sun Ra
Hey Ho (What You Do to Me!) – The Guess Who
Hoodoo Man Blues – Junior Wells' Chicago Blues Band w/ Buddy Guy
Houston – Dean Martin
Here Are The Sonics – The Sonics
Hush, Hush, Sweet Charlotte - Patti Page
I Ain't Marching Anymore – Phil Ochs
I Know a Place – Petula Clark
In Concert – The Dubliners
Is It Love? – Cilla Black
The In Crowd – The Ramsey Lewis Trio
In The Beginning – The Animals
Introducing Herman's Hermits – Herman's Hermits
 I'll Make All Your Dreams Come True – Ronnie Dove
The John Coltrane Quartet Plays – John Coltrane
 Jovem Guarda Roberto Carlos
Live at Carnegie Hall – Al Hirt
Live at the Coconut Grove – Sergio Franchi

Live at The Plugged Nickel – Miles Davis
Live at the Regal – B. B. King
L-O-V-E – Nat King Cole
A Man and His Music – Frank Sinatra
Maria Bethânia – Maria Bethânia
Mary Poppins – Original soundtrack
Meanwhile Back at the Whisky à Go Go – Johnny Rivers
My Fair Lady – Original soundtrack
My Kind of Broadway – Frank Sinatra
The Nancy Wilson Show! – Nancy Wilson
 One Kiss for Old Times' Sake – Ronnie Dove
Orbisongs – Roy Orbison
Our Fair Lady – Julie London
Our Shining Hour – Sammy Davis, Jr. and Count Basie
Papa's Got a Brand New Bag – James Brown
Pastel Blues – Nina Simone
Patrick Sky – Patrick Sky
Reencontro com Sambalanço Trio – Sambalanço Trio
Rolando Alarcón y sus canciones – Rolando Alarcón
The Scene Changes – Perry Como
See What Tomorrow Brings – Peter, Paul & Mary
She's Just My Style – Gary Lewis & the Playboys
Slightly Latin – Rahsaan Roland Kirk
Smokin' at the Half Note – Wynton Kelly and Wes Montgomery
Song for My Father – Horace Silver
Songs from My Heart – Loretta Lynn
A Song Will Rise – Peter, Paul & Mary
The Sound of Music – Original soundtrack
Sounds Like the Searchers – The Searchers
Stan Getz and Bill Evans – Stan Getz and Bill Evans
Storm Warning! – Dick Morrissey Quartet
The Sweetheart Tree – Johnny Mathis
Take It Easy – The Walker Brothers
That Honey Horn Sound – Al Hirt
That Was the Year That Was – Tom Lehrer
They're Playing Our Song – Al Hirt
The Transfiguration of Blind Joe Death – John Fahey
That Travelin' Two-Beat – Bing Crosby and Rosemary Clooney
Visor i närheten – Fred Åkerström
¡Viva! Vaughan – Sarah Vaughan
The Wonderful World of Antonio Carlos Jobim – Antonio Carlos Jobim
The World's Greatest International Hits – Petula Clark

Billboard Top popular records of 1965

from Billboard December 25, 1965 - 1966 International Record & Talent Showcase pg 22

TOP SINGLES OF 1965
The list below represents the top singles sides of the past year (Jan. 2 through Oct. 30 issue). The rank order in no way attempts to report actual
sales of any of the records involved. This chart was determined by an analysis of the week-to-week information utilized in compiling the Hot 100
chart. Many of the records, with possibly greater cumulative sales than some of those listed above them, are not so ranked because of the methodology
involved in this tabulation. Records that reached their peak prior to 1965 and after the Oct. 30, 1965, issue could not be fully represented. Other
records were affected in total points by the number of weeks on chart as well as week-to-week positions.

Billboard's October cutoff eliminated 17% of the 1965 year-end chart data, and prevented another 60 records from completing their full chart runs. The formula also included approximately 50 records from 1964, some of which had enough points to rank in the 1965 chart. Joel Whitburn's Records Research books, archived issues of Billboard for November-December 1964 and November 1965-March 1966, and other Hot 100 Year-End formulas were used to complete the 1965 year-end chart. 

The completed chart is composed of records that entered the Billboard Hot 100 between November 1964 and December 1965. Records with chart runs that started in 1964 and ended in 1965, or started in 1965 and ended in 1966, made this chart if the majority of their chart weeks were in 1965. If not, they were ranked in the year-end charts for 1964 or 1966. If their weeks were equal, they were listed in the year they first entered. Appearing in multiple years is not permitted. Each week fifteen points were awarded to the number one record, then nine points for number two, eight points for number three, and so on. The total points a record earned determined its year-end rank. The complete chart life of each record is represented, with number of points accrued. There are no ties, even when multiple records have the same number of points. The next ranking category is peak chart position, then weeks at peak chart position, weeks in top ten, weeks in top forty, and finally weeks on Hot 100 chart.

The chart can be sorted by Artist, Song title, Recording and Release dates, Cashbox year-end ranking (CB) or units sold (sales) by clicking on the column header. Additional details for each record can be accessed by clicking on the song title, and referring to the Infobox in the right column of the song page. Billboard also has chart summaries on its website. Cashbox rankings were derived by same process as the Billboard rankings. Sales information was derived from the RIAA's Gold and Platinum database, the BRIT Certified database  and The Book of Golden Discs, but numbers listed should be regarded as estimates. Grammy Hall of Fame and National Recording Registry information with sources can be found on Wikipedia.

Published popular music
 "Call Me" w.m. Tony Hatch
 "The Carnival Is Over" w. Tom Springfield
 "Do I Hear a Waltz?" w. Stephen Sondheim m. Richard Rodgers. Introduced by Elizabeth Allen in the musical Do I Hear a Waltz?.
 "Girl Talk" w. Bobby Troup m. Neal Hefti from the film Harlow
 "Goldfinger" w. Leslie Bricusse & Anthony Newley m. John Barry. Introduced by Shirley Bassey on the soundtrack of the film Goldfinger
 "Honey Come Back" w.m. Jimmy Webb
 "I Have Confidence" w.m. Richard Rodgers, from the film The Sound of Music
 "I Know a Place" w.m. Tony Hatch
 "The Impossible Dream" w. Joe Darion m. Mitch Leigh Introduced by Richard Kiley in the musical Man of La Mancha
 "Jeannie" w.m. Hugo Montenegro and Buddy Kaye, theme from the TV series I Dream of Jeannie
 "Michelle" w.m. John Lennon & Paul McCartney
 "Moment To Moment" w. Johnny Mercer m. Henry Mancini from the film Moment to Moment
 "On A Clear Day (You Can See Forever)" w. Alan Jay Lerner m. Burton Lane introduced by John Cullum in the musical On a Clear Day You Can See Forever. Performed in the 1970 film version by Yves Montand.
 "The Shadow of Your Smile" w. Paul Francis Webster m. Johnny Mandel
 "She Touched Me" w. Ira Levin m. Milton Schafer. Introduced by Elliott Gould in the musical Drat! The Cat!
 "Somewhere My Love"  Paul Francis Webster m. Maurice Jarre from the film Doctor Zhivago
 "Spanish Flea" m. Julius Wechter
 "What The World Needs Now Is Love". Hal David m. Burt Bacharach
 "What's New Pussycat?" w. Hal David m. Burt Bacharach from the film What's New Pussycat?
 "Who Can I Turn To?" w.m. Leslie Bricusse & Anthony Newley from the musical The Roar of the Greasepaint – The Smell of the Crowd
 "A World of Our Own" w.m. Tom Springfield
 "(On A) Wonderful Day Like Today" w.m. Leslie Bricusse & Anthony Newley from the musical The Roar of the Greasepaint – The Smell of the Crowd

Classical music

Premieres

Compositions
Gilbert Biberian – Greek Suite for guitar
Pierre Boulez - Éclat for ensemble
Carlos Chávez – Soli III for bassoon, trumpet, timpani, viola, and orchestra
George Crumb
Madrigals, Books I for soprano, vibraphone, and double bass
Madrigals, Books II for soprano, flute/alto flute/piccolo, and percussion
Mario Davidovsky – Inflexions for chamber ensemble
Henri Dutilleux – Résonances for piano
Roberto Gerhard – Concerto for Orchestra
Vittorio Giannini – Symphony no. 5
Wojciech Kilar – Springfield Sonnet for orchestra
Jan Klusák
Rejdovák for bass clarinet, viola and double bass
Sonata for String and Wind Instruments
Fantaisie lyrique
György Ligeti – Requiem for Soprano and Mezzo Soprano solo, mixed Chorus and Orchestra (1963–65)
Henri Pousseur
Miroir de Votre Faust (Caractères II) for piano with soprano ad libitum
Jeu de Miroirs de Votre Faust for piano, soprano ad libitum, and two-channel tape
Karlheinz Stockhausen – Mikrophonie II
Eduard Tubin – Sonata for viola and piano

Opera
Jack Beeson – Lizzie Borden, March 25, New York City Opera
Ned Rorem – Miss Julie, November 4, New York City Opera

Jazz

Musical theater
 Baker Street Broadway production opened at The Broadway Theatre and ran for 311 performances
 Carousel (Rodgers & Hammerstein) – Broadway revival
 Charlie Girl     London production opened at the Adelphi Theatre on December 15.
 Do I Hear A Waltz? (Richard Rodgers and Stephen Sondheim) – Broadway production opened at the 46th Street Theatre and ran for 220 performances
 Drat! The Cat! – Broadway production opened at the Martin Beck Theatre and ran for 8 performances
 Flora the Red Menace (Music: John Kander  Lyrics: Fred Ebb)  Broadway production opened on May 11 and ran for 87 performances.  Starring Liza Minnelli.
 Half a Sixpence – Broadway production opened at the Broadhurst Theatre and ran for 511 performances
 Hello, Dolly! (Jerry Herman) – London production
 Man of La Mancha (Joe Darion and Mitch Leigh) – Broadway production opened at the Martin Beck Theatre and ran for 2,328 performances.  The show won five Tony Awards
 On a Clear Day You Can See Forever – Broadway production opened at the Mark Hellinger Theatre and ran for 280 performances
 Pickwick – Broadway production opened at the 46th Street Theatre and ran for 56 performances
 The Roar of the Greasepaint – The Smell of the Crowd – Broadway production opened at the Schubert Theatre and ran for 231 performances
 Twang! (Music, Lyrics and Book: Lionel Bart) London production opened at the Shaftesbury Theatre on December 20.

Musical films
 Bangaru Panjaram, Telugu musical drama
 Funny Things Happen Down Under, Australia/New Zealand co-production starring Olivia Newton-John
 Help!, directed by Richard Lester, starring The Beatles
 Inside the Forbidden City, Hong Kong musical opera film
 Janwar, Hindi film
 Malangi, Pakistani film in Punjabi, with music by Master Abdullah
 Samba, Brazilian-Spanish co-production starring Sara Montiel, Marc Michel and Fosco Giachetti
 The Sound of Music directed by Robert Wise, starring Julie Andrews and Christopher Plummer
 Waqt, Hindi film
 When the Boys Meet the Girls, starring Connie Francis

Births
January 4  
Beth Gibbons, English singer-songwriter, British vocalist (Portishead and Rustin Man) 
David Glasper, British vocalist Breathe
January 7 – John Ondrasik (or Five for Fighting), American singer-songwriter and pianist
January 9 – Haddaway,  Trinidadian-German singer, songwriter and musician
January 12 – Rob Zombie, American musician, filmmaker and screenwriter and heavy metal musician (White Zombie)
January 14 – Slick Rick, English rapper
January 15 – Adam Jones, American guitarist and songwriter (Tool and Electric Sheep)
January 20
Greg K. (The Offspring)
Heather Small, British soul singer (M People)
January 22
Steven Adler (Guns N' Roses)
DJ Jazzy Jeff, American rapper and actor
January 25 – Toni Halliday, lead singer and bass guitarist of Curve and Photofitz
January 26 – Siavash Shams, Iranian singer
February 9 – Stephin Merritt from The Magnetic Fields
February 18 – Dr. Dre, American rapper, record producer, and entrepreneur
February 20 – Inna Zhelannaya, Russian singer-songwriter
February 25 – Brian Baker of Minor Threat, the Meatmen and Bad Religion
February 27 – Frank Peter Zimmermann, German violinist
March 4
Andrew Collins, British radio DJ and journalist
WestBam (Maximillian Lenz), German DJ
March 12 – Liza Umarova, Chechen singer and actress
March 23 – Marti Pellow, Scottish vocalist (Wet Wet Wet)
March 24 – Patrick Scales, British-German electric bass guitar player
April 1  – Robert Steadman, English composer
April 3 – Nazia Hassan, Pakistani pop singer (d. 2000)
April 6 – Black Francis, vocalist, songwriter, and guitarist (Pixies)
April 12 – Pinchers, reggae/dancehall artist
April 15 – Linda Perry, American singer-songwriter and record producer. 
April 18 – Vinnie Moore, guitarist
April 19
Suge Knight, American record producer
Natalie Dessay, French soprano
April 23 – Tommy DeCarlo, vocalist (Boston)
April 25 – Eric Avery (Jane's Addiction)
May 7 – Chris O'Connor, vocalist and guitarist (Primitive Radio Gods)
May 13 – Tasmin Little, English violinist
May 16 – Krist Novoselic, Croatian-American bassist Nirvana
May 17 – Trent Reznor, American singer, songwriter, musician, record producer, and film score composer (Nine Inch Nails)
May 22 – Catie Curtis, American singer-songwriter
May 28 – Chris Ballew, American rock musician (The Presidents of the United States of America)
May 31 – Lisa I'Anson, British DJ
June 5 – Tyler Bates, American musician, music producer, and composer for films, television, and video games (Zack Snyder, Sucker Punch,  Marilyn Manson,  Marius de Vries,  Guardians of the Galaxy)  
June 7
Jean-Pierre François, French footballer and singer
Christine Roque, French singer
June 10 
Joey Santiago (Pixies)
June 19 – Sean Marshall, American child actor and singer
June 28 – Sonny Strait, American voice actor and singer
June 29 - Tripp Eisen, American Musician 
July 4 – Jo Whiley, British radio DJ
July 5 – Eyran Katsenelenbogen, Israeli jazz pianist
July 9
Frank Bello (Anthrax)
July 13
Akina Nakamori, Japanese pop singer
Eileen Ivers, American fiddler (Cherish the Ladies)
July 19 – Evelyn Glennie, Scottish percussionist
July 23
Rob Dickinson, English singer-songwriter and guitarist (Catherine Wheel)
Slash, guitarist (Guns N' Roses, Velvet Revolver)
July 28 – Daniela Mercury, Brazilian singer
August 6
Ravi Coltrane, American saxophonist
Yuki Kajiura, Japanese composer
August 18 – Koji Kikkawa, Japanese singer
August 19 – Johan Botha, South African operatic tenor
August 28 – Shania Twain, Canadian country-pop singer-songwriter and performer
September 1 – Craig McLachlan, Australian actor and singer
September 3 – Todd Lewis, (Toadies)
September 7 – Angela Gheorghiu, Romanian soprano
September 7 –  Paolo Tortiglione, Italian Composer and musicologist
September 11 – Moby, American musician
September 12 – Norwood Fisher, Fishbone
September 13 – Zak Starkey, drummer, son of Ringo Starr
September 16 – Stephen Shareaux, American singer-songwriter (Kik Tracee and Zen From Mars)
September 23 – Marco Blaauw, trumpeter (musikFabrik)
September 26 – Cindy Herron, American singer (En Vogue)
October 8 – C.J. Ramone, bassist (Ramones)
October 14 – Constantine Koukias, Australian composer
October 18 – Curtis Stigers, American jazz musician and singer
October 20 – Jil Caplan, French singer and songwriter
October 22 – John Wesley Harding, singer
October 26
Aaron Kwok, Hong Kong singer and actor
Sakari Oramo, Finnish conductor
October 30 – Gavin Rossdale, English musician (Gwen Stefani) 
November 4
Pata, Japanese rock guitarist (X Japan)
Jeff Scott Soto, American musician
Wayne Static, American rock singer (Static-X)
November 9 – Bryn Terfel, Welsh bass-baritone
November 10 – Jonas Åkerlund, Swedish music video director and drummer
November 20 – Yoshiki Hayashi, Japanese rock composer, piano and drummer (X Japan)
November 21
Björk,  Icelandic singer, songwriter, musician, businesswomen, record producer, and DJ
Gabrielle Glaser (Luscious Jackson)
November 18 – Tim DeLaughter, American singer-songwriter (Tripping Daisy and The Polyphonic Spree)
November 22 – Sen Dog (Cypress Hill)
November 25 – Tim Armstrong, American singer and musician (Rancid)
November 29 - Yutaka Ozaki, Japanese singer and musician (d. 1992)
December 5 – John Rzeznik, American rock singer (The Goo Goo Dolls)
December 23 – Bobby Schayer (Bad Religion)
December 29 – Dexter Holland, American rock singer (The Offspring)
Date unknown
Kepa Junkera, Basque accordionist and composer
Joakim Sundström, Swedish sound editor, sound designer and musician
Sonja Yelich, New Zealand poet and mother of singer-songwriters, Lorde and Indy Yelich.

Deaths
January 13 – Leo Funtek, violinist, conductor and arranger, 79
January 14 – Jeanette MacDonald, singer and actress, 61
January 20 – Alan Freed, DJ who first used the phrase Rock and Roll, 43
January 21 – Reino Helismaa, singer-songwriter
February 2 – Charles W. Harrison, ballad singer, 86
February 7 – Viggo Brodersen, pianist and composer, 85
February 14 – Désiré-Émile Inghelbrecht, conductor and composer, 84
February 15 – Nat King Cole, singer and pianist, 45
February 25 – Leo Sirota, pianist
March 2 – Ján Valašťan Dolinský, composer
March 4 – Asadata Dafora, drummer
March 8 – Tadd Dameron, jazz pianist and composer, 48
March 22 – Harry Tierney, musical theatre composer
March 29 – Zlatko Baloković, violinist, 70
April 7 – David Hellström, songwriter, 81
April 12 – La Belle Otero, dancer and courtesan
April 26 –  Michael Bohnen, operatic bass-baritone and actor, 77
May 1 – Spike Jones, comedy musician, 53
May 14 – Joe Sanders, jazz pianist, singer and bandleader, 68
June 18 – George Melachrino, English conductor, singer and composer
July 8 – Willie Dennis, jazz trombonist, 39
July 14 – Spencer Williams, pianist, singer and composer
July 17 – Frank Ryan, tenor, 65
September 4 – Albert Schweitzer, missionary, musician, and author on Bach
September 8 – Dorothy Dandridge, actress and singer, 42
September 9 – Julián Carrillo, Mexican composer, conductor, violinist and music theorist, 90
September 10 – Bobby Jordan, actor and musician, 42
September 15 – Steve Brown, jazz musician
September 25 – Nikolai Sokoloff, violinist and conductor, 79
October 17 – Cléo de Mérode, dancer
October 21 – Bill Black, US musician, 39
October 25 – Hans Knappertsbusch, German conductor, 77
October 27 – Peter La Farge, folk singer-songwriter, 34
November 6
Edgard Varèse, French composer, 81
Clarence Williams, jazz musician and composer, 67
November 18 – Lou Black, banjo player, 64
November 19 – Joe Falcon, Cajun accordionist, 65
November 21
Cecil Brower, jazz violinist, 50 (perforated ulcer)
Naoum Blinder, violinist and teacher born in the Ukraine, 76 (if born July 19, 1889, per some sources)
November 25 – Dame Myra Hess, pianist, 75
December 3 – Hank D'Amico, jazz and swing musician
December 10 – Henry Cowell, composer
December 11 – Rafael Hernández Marín, composer, 73
December 16 – Tito Schipa, tenor, 76
December 20 – Charlie Burse, blues musician, 64
date unknown – Craig Campbell, operatic tenor, 77

Awards

Grammy Awards
Grammy Awards of 1965

Eurovision Song Contest
Eurovision Song Contest 1965

See also
Hot 100 No. 1 Hits of 1965

References

 
20th century in music
Music by year